The 2019 Houston Baptist Huskies football team represented Houston Baptist University—now known as Houston Christian University—as a member of the Southland Conference during the 2019 NCAA Division I FCS football season. Led by seventh-year head coach Vic Shealy the Huskies compiled an overall record of 5–7 with a mark of 2–6 in conference play, placing tenth in the Southland. Houston Baptist played home games at Husky Stadium in Houston.

The Huskies' five wins set a new program record.

Previous season
The Huskies finished the 2018 season 1–10, 0–9 in Southland play to finish in last place.

Preseason

Preseason poll
The Southland Conference released their preseason poll on July 18, 2019. The Huskies were picked to finish in eleventh place.

Preseason All–Southland Teams
The Huskies placed three players on the preseason all–Southland teams.

Offense

2nd team

Jerreth Sterns – WR

Defense

2nd team

Andre Walker – DL

Caleb Johnson – LB

Schedule

Game summaries

at UTEP

Texas Wesleyan

at South Dakota

Northwestern State

Texas Southern

Incarnate Word

at Abilene Christian

at McNeese State

Southeastern Louisiana

at Nicholls

Lamar

at Sam Houston State

References

Houston Baptist
Houston Christian Huskies football seasons
Houston Baptist Huskies football